Mike Guentzel (born August 23, 1962) is an American ice hockey coach and former defenceman. He currently works as a pro scout for the Arizona Coyotes.

Career
Guentzel played four years at Minnesota before embarking on a short professional career. After hanging up his skates in 1986 he turned to coaching and joined the staff of the St. Paul Vulcans of the USHL. After a year as an assistant he was named head coach, serving in that capacity for four campaigns before accepting the same position with the Omaha Lancers. In 1994 he returned to his alma mater as an assistant coach, serving under first Doug Woog and then Don Lucia after the former retired in 1999. Twice Guentzel served as head coach for Minnesota when Woog was suspended, first for the 1996 WCHA Title Game and a second time the following October. Guentzel helped the Golden Gophers win back-to-back national titles in 2002 and 2003 and stayed with the team until resigning to pursue other opportunities in 2008.

Guentzel's first stop was at Colorado College as an assistant for the 2008–09 season. The following year, after coaching his son Gabe, he returned to the USHL to lead the Des Moines Buccaneers but after a poor year he was back in the college ranks, this time with Nebraska–Omaha. Guentzel was again on the move after a year with the Mavericks and he returned to the Golden Gophers in the summer of 2011. Guentzel has remained with the Gophers since and was promoted to associate head coach in 2015.

Personal life
Three of Mike's sons, Ryan, Gabe and Jake have all played college ice hockey with both Gabe and Jake playing professionally.

Head coaching record

College

†Guentzel served as interim coach for three games while Doug Woog was suspended on two occasions

References

External links

1962 births
Living people
American ice hockey coaches
American men's ice hockey defensemen
Arizona Coyotes scouts
Minnesota Golden Gophers men's ice hockey coaches
Minnesota Golden Gophers men's ice hockey players
New Haven Nighthawks players
Ice hockey coaches from Minnesota
New York Rangers draft picks
People from Grand Rapids, Minnesota
Salt Lake Golden Eagles (IHL) players
Ice hockey players from Minnesota